Shiv Prasad Sahu (7 January 1934 - 23 January 2001) was an Indian businessman and politician. He was a Member of Parliament, representing Ranchi, Bihar  twice in the Lok Sabha the lower house of India's Parliament as a member of the Indian National Congress. 

He was general secretary of Chhota Nagpur Bauxite Workers' Union,  Ranchi District Bauxite and China Clay Mines Employees Union. He was Chairman of several colleges, schools and Chairman of Lohardaga Municipality. He died on 23 January 2001.

References

External links
Official biographical sketch in Parliament of India website

Lok Sabha members from Bihar
Indian National Congress politicians
People from Lohardaga district
1934 births
2001 deaths
Nagpuria people